Westaff is a staffing company based in Santa Barbara, California, United States, with more than 75 franchises located throughout the United States. Westaff is a wholly owned division of EmployBridge.

Westaff provides workers for administrative, clerical, light industrial, and technology positions and offers temporary, temp-to-hire, and full-time placement services. It has more than 75 offices, including some at customers' facilities. None of Westaff's offices are company-owned; all offices are operated as franchises. Most of the offices are in rural and suburban areas. Westaff operates throughout the US, principally in the East, South, and Midwest. Robert W. Stover founded the staffing firm in 1948.

Key dates

1948: Western Employers Service, the first temporary staffing service on the West Coast, is founded by W. Robert Stover.
1958: Western Employers Service becomes Western Girl, Inc.
1963: Light Industrial Division begins operation.
1964-66: First international office opens in Mexico City, followed by offices in Denmark, Norway, Australia, and the United Kingdom.
1967: Western Medical Services is established.
1973: Western Girl is renamed Western Temporary Services.
1980: First office in Switzerland opens.
1984: Franchise Sales Program is launched.
1985: First office in New Zealand opens.
1987: Western Temporary opens its 300th office.
1990: Western Medical Services begins licensing offices as home health agencies.
1994: Western Temporary Services becomes Western Staff Services.
1996: Western Staff's initial public offering is effective April 30.
1997: Western Staff makes 16 acquisitions in the United States, Australia, and New Zealand.
1998: Western Staff Services becomes Westaff.
1999: Westaff sells its subsidiary Western Medical Services.
2009: The Select Family of Staffing Companies (now known as EmployBridge) acquired Westaff in March.

Further reading
Calbreath, Dean, 'Western Temp May Let Public Share in Firm,' San Francisco Business Times, September 6, 1991, p. 17.
Ford, George C., 'Founder of California-Based Westaff Anticipates Strong Growth Past 2000,' Knight-Ridder/Tribune Business News, October 27, 1998.
Guynn, Jessica, 'Western Staff Services of Walnut Creek, Calif., Picks New Name,' Contra Costa Times, September 25, 1998.
'North Pole Unemployment: 0%,' Time, November 25, 1985, p. 86.
'Sparta Surgical Corporation To Acquire All of the Assets of Western Medical Services, Inc.,' PRNewswire, March 22, 1999.
Speer, Tibbett L. 'Temporary Sanity: W. Robert Stover Is Too Private To Ever Go Public. Yet His Walnut Creek Temporary Agency—First of Its Kind in the West, Now 10th-Largest in the Country—Is About To Do Just That,' Diablo Business, January 1993.
'Walnut Creek, Calif.-Based Temporary Hire Firm Hopes Stock Rebounds,' Contra Costa Times, April 11, 1999.
Watson, Lloyd, 'Walnut Creek Company's Schools for Santas,' San Francisco Chronicle, November 18, 1988, p. C3.
Welch, Michael, 'Temporary Solutions ... May Last Longer Than You Think,' Corporate Report-Minnesota, June 1992, p. 61.
'Western Staff Services Acquires MERBCO, Inc.,' Business Wire, October 23, 1995.
'Western Staff Services Celebrates 47th Year in Business; Opens 25 Offices in the U.S. and U.K.; Acquires Companies in Australia and Norway,' Business Wire, August 7, 1995.

External links
Westaff Official Website
International Job Opportunity

Companies based in Santa Barbara, California
Employment agencies of the United States
Business services companies established in 1948
1996 initial public offerings
2009 mergers and acquisitions
Companies formerly listed on the Nasdaq
1948 establishments in California